The Ninja diet was a form of military rations historically consumed by ninjas.

According to Hakim Isler, the 3 most common food pills were Suikatsugan, Hyorougan and Kikatsugan.

Hyorougan was made of glutinous rice, ordinary rice, lotus seed, Chinese yam,  cinnamon, adlay, Asian ginseng and sugar. Other source say that Hyorougan was made from wheat powder, saké, sticky rice and carrots. According to Hakim Isler, they were made of non-glutinous rice, lotus fruits, yams, ginseng and crystal sugar.

Suikatsugan pills were made with pickled plum (umeboshi), buckwheat flour, and yams.

The Kikatsugan, or starve pill, was designed to help the ninjas when in starvation, being made from glutinous rice, sake, dried chickweed, ginseng, buckwheat, adlay and yams.

References 

Ninja